Ulsan Jungang Market or Ulsan Central Market is a traditional street market in Jung-gu, Ulsan, South Korea. It is the largest traditional market in Ulsan. The market contains many shops that sell fruit, vegetables, meat, fish, breads, clothing, and Korean traditional medicinal items. The market also has many small restaurants and street-food stalls. The market is also home to "Barbeque Eel ally", which is a street famous for the many restaurants serving freshly-killed barbequed pike eel that can be found there.

See also
 List of markets in South Korea
 List of South Korean tourist attractions

References

External links
 Official website  
 Official city tourism information for Ulsan Central Market 

Jung District, Ulsan
Retail markets in Ulsan
Food markets in South Korea